Heughscar Hill is a hill in the east of the English Lake District, east of Ullswater and north of High Street, Cumbria. It is the subject of a chapter of Wainwright's book The Outlying Fells of Lakeland. It reaches  and Wainwright's route is an anticlockwise circuit starting at Askham. He describes it as ''"A gem for aged fellwalkers"'.

References

 

Fells of the Lake District
Askham, Cumbria